Lindsay Davenport and Martina Hingis were the defending champions, but Hingis instead competed in the Women's Doubles event. Davenport played alongside Mary Joe Fernández and was eliminated in the round robin.

Kim Clijsters and Martina Navratilova won the title, defeating Nathalie Dechy and Sandrine Testud in the final, 5–7, 7–5, [10–7].

Draw

Final

Group A
Standings are determined by: 1. number of wins; 2. number of matches; 3. in three-players-ties, percentage of sets won, or of games won; 4. steering-committee decision.

Group B
Standings are determined by: 1. number of wins; 2. number of matches; 3. in three-players-ties, percentage of sets won, or of games won; 4. steering-committee decision.

References
Main Draw

Women's Legends Doubles